Ariel Versace (born April 13, 1992) is the stage name of Bryan Philip Neel, an American drag queen and wig designer, most known for competing on season 11 of the television series RuPaul's Drag Race. The self-described "bratz doll" was born in New Jersey and goes by the name Bryan Philip on OnlyFans.

Career 
Bryan Neel was born to Susan Neel and started performing in drag in 2013. The name Ariel Versace comes from the main character of "The Little Mermaid" and the fashion brand. In 2015, she worked as a makeup artist for the indie movie "Deadly Gamble".

She was announced as one of fifteen queens cast on RuPaul's Drag Race in 2019. She was eliminated in the monster ball challenge in episode five due to infamously slipping and falling in the lip sync for your life. Shortly after the season ended, she released her first single, "Venomous" on June 4, 2019.

She owns a wig business called Drag By Chariel with her partner Chastity St. Cartier.

Filmography

Television

Web series

Discography

As lead artist

References

External links 
 

Living people
1992 births
American drag queens
LGBT people from New Jersey
Ariel Versace